E. C. Stearns Bicycle Agency was established in 1893 by industrialist Edward C. Stearns, who began business as a hardware manufacturer and branched out into bicycle production from 1893 through 1899.

Advertisements

References

External links 

 1895 Stearns
 1896 Stearns Yellow Fellow
 1902 Stearns Yellow Fellow Convertible Tandem Model "U"

Cycle manufacturers of the United States
Defunct companies based in Syracuse, New York
Vehicle manufacturing companies established in 1893
1893 establishments in New York (state)
1899 disestablishments in New York (state)
American companies disestablished in 1899
American companies established in 1893